

Dengie is a peninsula in Essex, England, that once formed a hundred of the same name (sometimes spelled Dengy).

The peninsula is formed by the River Crouch to the south, the Blackwater to the north, both of which are tidal, and the North Sea to the east. The eastern part of the peninsula is marshy and forms the Dengie Marshes.

The western boundary of Dengie hundred ran from North Fambridge to a bit west of Maldon.  The peninsula forms about half of the Maldon local government district.

Places on the peninsula are:

Althorne
Asheldham
Bradwell-on-Sea
Bradwell Waterside
Burnham-on-Crouch
Cold Norton
Creeksea
Dengie (village)
Hazeleigh
Langford
Latchingdon
Maldon
Mayland
Maylandsea
Mundon
North Fambridge
Ostend
Purleigh
Ramsey Island
Snoreham
Southminster
Steeple 
Stow Maries
St Lawrence Bay
Tillingham
Woodham Mortimer
Woodham Walter

Farming on the Dengie Peninsula 
The soil on the Dengie Peninsula is very rich. The area usually has mild winters.

The Dengie Peninsula is home to some of the oldest and largest vineyards in the UK, including:
 Clayhill Vineyard
 New Hall Vineyard

See also
Dengie SPA

References

External links
Photographs of the Dengie Hundred
Information and photographs of the villages of the Dengie Hundred
Information and photographs of Burnham on Crouch which is the main town of the Dengie Hundred
The local magazine for Burnham-on-Crouch and the Dengie Hundred villages
The history of the Dengie Hundred
Photographs of the Dengie Peninsula at geograph.org.uk
Bellringing on the Dengie Peninsula

Maldon District
Landforms of Essex
Peninsulas of England